Ogunlade Davidson (26 May 1949 – 8 October 2022) was a Sierra Leonean scientist who was co-chair of the Working Group III, Intergovernmental Panel on Climate Change from 1997 until 2001, during the 4th Assessment Report. He was also an IPCC Vice-Chair from 2008-2014. From 1996 to 2000, he held the post of  Dean of the   Faculty of Engineering, Fourah Bay College, University of Sierra Leone.

Davidson was appointed Minister of Energy and Water Resources of Sierra Leone during the Ernest Bai Koroma Administration.

Davidson died in 8 October 2022, at the age of 73.

References

1949 births
2022 deaths
Academic staff of Fourah Bay College
Sierra Leone Creole people
Sierra Leonean scientists
Fellows of the African Academy of Sciences